Mount Samat National Shrine or Dambana ng Kagitingan (Shrine of Valor) is a historical shrine located near the summit of Mount Samat in the town of Pilar, Province of Bataan, in the Republic of the Philippines. The memorial shrine complex was built to honor and remember the gallantry of Filipino and American soldiers who fought against the Imperial Japanese Army during World War II.

Consisting of a Colonnade and the large Memorial Cross, the park was commissioned in 1966 by then-President Ferdinand Marcos, for the 25th anniversary of World War II. The white Memorial Cross stands as a remembrance to the soldiers who fought and lost their lives in the Battle of Bataan. The shrine complex also includes a war museum with a wide array of collections from paintings of the Philippine heroes, to armaments used by the Filipino, American and Japanese forces during the battle.

History
Along with the fortified island of Corregidor, Mount Samat was the site of the most vicious battle against the Japanese Imperial Army in 1942 during the Battle of Bataan. Suffering heavy losses against the Japanese all over Luzon, Filipino and American soldiers retreated to Bataan Peninsula to regroup for a last valiant but futile stand. This retreat to Bataan is part of a United States strategy known as War Plan Orange.

Bataan fell after three months of fighting when 78,000 exhausted, sick and starving men under Major General Edward P. King surrendered to the Japanese on 9 April 1942. It is the single largest surrender of U.S. soldiers in history. Together with the Philippine soldiers, they were then led on the Bataan Death March.

The scene of their last stronghold is Mount Samat, the site of Dambana ng Kagitingan. The shrine was conceived as a fitting memorial to the heroic struggle and sacrifices of the soldiers who fought and died in that historic bastion of freedom.

The memorial shrine complex was started with the laying of the cornerstone by President Marcos on April 14, 1966. Due to lack of funds, construction was unfinished for the 25th anniversary of the Fall of Bataan in 1967. The shrine was completed and inaugurated in 1970, in time for the 25th anniversary of the end of World War II.

Architectural features
The shrine was designed by Lorenzo del Castillo and landscaped by Dolly Quimbo-Perez.

Colonnade
From the parking lot, a wide three series of steps that narrows to the top lead visitors to the flagpole that holds the flag of the Philippines. The last series of steps to the Colonnade level are bordered on two sides by two pedestals topped with bronze urns symbolising the eternal flame.

The Colonnade is a marble-clad structure surrounded by an esplanade, itself surrounded by marble-clad parapets. The outer side is covered with 19 high relief sculptures by National Artist Napoleon Abueva, and alternates depictions of the war with 18 bronze insignia of USAFFE Division units by Talleres de Maximo Vicente, Leonides Valdez, and Angel Sampra and Sons. Each bronze insignia has a flagstaff for the flags of each division.

In the centre of the Colonnade is the altar, behind which are three religious stained glass murals designed by Cenon Rivera and executed by Vetrate D'Arte Giuliani of Rome, Italy. Four large bronze chandeliers hang from the ceiling, while inscribed in marble on the two lateral walls is a narrative of the “Battle of Bataan”.

A footpath that leads to the base of the Memorial Cross begins behind the Colonnade. The 14-flight, zig-zagging path on the mountain slope is paved with bloodstones from Corregidor Island. An alternate road also takes visitors to the base of the Memorial Cross.

Memorial Cross

The monument is made of steel and reinforced concrete with a lift and viewing gallery at the Cross's arms. A staircase also leads to the gallery in the wings.

The exterior of the Cross is finished with chipped granolithic marble. The base until the  level is capped with sculptural slabs and relief titled Nabiag Na Bato also by Abueva, depicting important historical figures and events like the execution of Jose Rizal, Lapu-Lapu and Antonio Luna.

Gallery

References

External links

Dambana ng Kagitingan page at the Philippine Veterans Affairs Office website
Dambana ng Kagitingan/Shrine of Valor
Mount Samat Photos
Mt. Samat Shrine in Bataan

Buildings and structures in Bataan
World War II museums
Monuments and memorials in the Philippines
Military and war museums in the Philippines
Mountain monuments and memorials
Tourist attractions in Bataan
National Shrines of the Philippines